The Pilatus SB-5 was a civil utility aircraft developed by the newly formed Pilatus Aircraft during World War II.

Design and development
In the winter of 1941, the construction of the Pilatus SB-2 Pelican began, designed as a low-speed aircraft with STOL (Short Take-Off and Landing) performance, as well as very good climbing performance required for use in narrow alpine valleys. The Pilatus SB-5 was a project for an enlarged version of the Pilatus SB-2, but with the end of WWII the market for light utility transports disappeared so Pilatus abandoned the SB-5 before construction of a prototype began.

The SB-5 was a single-engine high wing monoplane with a fixed nosewheel with a light-alloy semi-monocoque fuselage shell, accommodating 9-10 passengers in 3 rows of three, with an optional passenger in the co-pilot seat. Power was to have been supplied by a Wright Cyclone driving an Escher-Wyss constant-speed reversible pitch 3-bladed propeller.

Specifications (SB-5)

References

Further reading

External links

 

 

1940s Swiss civil utility aircraft
High-wing aircraft
Single-engined tractor aircraft
SB-5